Camp Bidwell, later Camp Chico, was a U.S. Army post during the American Civil War.  Camp Bidwell was named for John Bidwell, the founder of the nearby town of Chico, California, and a brigadier general of the California Militia.  It was established a mile outside Chico, by Lt. Col. Ambrose E. Hooker with Company A, 6th California Infantry, on August 26, 1863.  Although a Company F, 2nd California Cavalry and Company K, 2nd California Infantry under Captain Augustus W. Starr had been there from July 31, 1863, Lt. Col. Hooker moved the camp to a new location for its better defense and for better sanitation.

By early 1865, it was being referred to as Camp Chico when a post called Camp Bidwell was established in the far northeastern corner of California, later to be named Fort Bidwell.  Observing confusion between the two, Robert W. Pease explained that such a transfer of name between outposts was a common Army practice of the time.

Commanders 
 Lt. Colonel Ambrose E. Hooker,  August 26, 1863 – October 20, 1863
 Captain Augustus W. Starr,  October 20, 1863 – April 1864
 Captain James C. Doughty,  June 1864 – May 1865

Garrison 
 Company F, 2nd California Cavalry, July 1863 – April 1864 
 Company K, 2nd California Infantry, August 16, 1863 – October 26, 1863 
 Company A, 6th California Infantry, August 26, 1863 – October 20, 1863 
 Company B, 1st Battalion California Volunteer Mountaineers, May 1864? 
 Company I, 2nd California Cavalry, June 1864 – May 1865

References

Sources:
  Records of California men in the war of the rebellion 1861 to 1867 by California. Adjutant General's Office, SACRAMENTO: State Office, J. D. Young, Supt. State Printing. 1890.

Chico, California
History of Butte County, California
Closed installations of the United States Army
California in the American Civil War
American Civil War army posts
1863 establishments in California